Adan Ahmed Elmi  was the 4th Agricultural Minister of Somaliland. He became the Agricultural Minister on May 10, 2002, after the resignation of Ali Sheik Yusuf.

Background 
Elmi was born in Hargeisa, and spent his childhood in Mogadishu and Hargeisa .  He hails from Gashanbur Eidagale Garhajis sub-clan of the Somali Isaaq clan. 

Before his appointment to the Somaliland parliament, he was widely known for his comic Somali films, which were released in the late 1990s. In 2001, he joined the UDUB political party.

Elmi is the son of Ahmed Elmi, a military commander during the Siad Barre years, now deceased. His mother, Khadija Mohamoud , owns fruit company in eastern Hargeisa. Belonging to the extended Dhoolayare family, he has three siblings, all of whom reside abroad.

References

External links 
 (Brief history of Somaliland)

1966 births
Living people
United Peoples' Democratic Party politicians
People from Hargeisa